Richard Wesley Hamming (February 11, 1915 – January 7, 1998) was an American mathematician whose work had many implications for computer engineering and telecommunications. His contributions include the Hamming code (which makes use of a Hamming matrix), the Hamming window, Hamming numbers, sphere-packing (or Hamming bound), Hamming graph concepts, and the Hamming distance.

Born in Chicago, Hamming attended University of Chicago, University of Nebraska and the University of Illinois at Urbana–Champaign, where he wrote his doctoral thesis in mathematics under the supervision of Waldemar Trjitzinsky (1901–1973). In April 1945 he joined the Manhattan Project at the Los Alamos Laboratory, where he programmed the IBM calculating machines that computed the solution to equations provided by the project's physicists. He left to join the Bell Telephone Laboratories in 1946. Over the next fifteen years he was involved in nearly all of the laboratories' most prominent achievements. For his work he received the Turing Award in 1968, being its third recipient.

After retiring from the Bell Labs in 1976, Hamming took a position at the Naval Postgraduate School in Monterey, California, where he worked as an adjunct professor and senior lecturer in computer science, and devoted himself to teaching and writing books. He delivered his last lecture in December 1997, just a few weeks before he died from a heart attack on January 7, 1998.

Early life 
Richard Wesley Hamming was born in Chicago, Illinois, on February 11, 1915, the son of Richard J. Hamming, a credit manager, and Mabel G. Redfield. He grew up in Chicago, where he attended Crane Technical High School and Crane Junior College.

Hamming initially wanted to study engineering, but money was scarce during the Great Depression, and the only scholarship offer he received came from the University of Chicago, which had no engineering school. Instead, he became a science student, majoring in mathematics, and received his Bachelor of Science degree in 1937. He later considered this a fortunate turn of events. "As an engineer," he said, "I would have been the guy going down manholes instead of having the excitement of frontier research work."

He went on to earn a Master of Arts degree from the University of Nebraska in 1939, and then entered the University of Illinois at Urbana–Champaign, where he wrote his doctoral thesis on Some Problems in the Boundary Value Theory of Linear Differential Equations under the supervision of Waldemar Trjitzinsky. His thesis was an extension of Trjitzinsky's work in that area. He looked at Green's function and further developed Jacob Tamarkin's methods for obtaining characteristic solutions. While he was a graduate student, he discovered and read George Boole's  The Laws of Thought.

The University of Illinois at Urbana–Champaign awarded Hamming his Doctor of Philosophy in 1942, and he became an instructor in mathematics there. He married Wanda Little, a fellow student, on September 5, 1942, immediately after she was awarded her own Master of Arts in English literature. They would remain married until his death, and had no children. In 1944, he became an assistant professor at the J.B. Speed Scientific School at the University of Louisville in Louisville, Kentucky.

Manhattan Project 
With World War II still ongoing, Hamming left Louisville in April 1945 to work on the Manhattan Project at the Los Alamos Laboratory, in Hans Bethe's division, programming the IBM calculating machines that computed the solution to equations provided by the project's physicists. His wife Wanda soon followed, taking a job at Los Alamos as a human computer, working for Bethe and Edward Teller. Hamming later recalled that:

Hamming remained at Los Alamos until 1946, when he accepted a post at the  Bell Telephone Laboratories (BTL). For the trip to New Jersey, he bought Klaus Fuchs's old car. When he later sold it just weeks before Fuchs was unmasked as a spy, the FBI regarded the timing as suspicious enough to interrogate Hamming. Although Hamming described his role at Los Alamos as being that of a "computer janitor", he saw computer simulations of experiments that would have been impossible to perform in a laboratory. "And when I had time to think about it," he later recalled, "I realized that it meant that science was going to be changed".

Bell Laboratories 

At the Bell Labs Hamming shared an office for a time with Claude Shannon. The Mathematical Research Department also included John Tukey and Los Alamos veterans Donald Ling and Brockway McMillan. Shannon, Ling, McMillan and Hamming came to call themselves the Young Turks. "We were first-class troublemakers," Hamming later recalled. "We did unconventional things in unconventional ways and still got valuable results. Thus management had to tolerate us and let us alone a lot of the time."

Although Hamming had been hired to work on elasticity theory, he still spent much of his time with the calculating machines. Before he went home on one Friday in 1947, he set the machines to perform a long and complex series of calculations over the weekend, only to find when he arrived on Monday morning that an error had occurred early in the process and the calculation had errored off. Digital machines manipulated information as sequences of zeroes and ones, units of information that Tukey would christen "bits". If a single bit in a sequence was wrong, then the whole sequence would be. To detect this, a parity bit was used to verify the correctness of each sequence. "If the computer can tell when an error has occurred," Hamming reasoned, "surely there is a way of telling where the error is so that the computer can correct the error itself."

Hamming set himself the task of solving this problem, which he realised would have an enormous range of applications. Each bit can only be a zero or a one, so if you know which bit is wrong, then it can be corrected. In a landmark paper published in 1950, he introduced a concept of the number of positions in which two code words differ, and therefore how many changes are required to transform one code word into another, which is today known as the Hamming distance. Hamming thereby created a family of mathematical error-correcting codes, which are called Hamming codes. This not only solved an important problem in telecommunications and computer science, it opened up a whole new field of study.

The Hamming bound, also known as the sphere-packing or volume bound is a limit on the parameters of an arbitrary block code. It is from an interpretation in terms of sphere packing in the Hamming distance into the space of all possible words.  It gives an important limitation on the efficiency with which any error-correcting code can utilize the space in which its code words are embedded.  A code which attains the Hamming bound is said to be a perfect code. Hamming codes are perfect codes.

Returning to differential equations, Hamming studied means of numerically integrating them. A popular approach at the time was Milne's Method, attributed to Arthur Milne. This had the drawback of being unstable, so that under certain conditions the result could be swamped by roundoff noise. Hamming developed an improved version, the Hamming predictor-corrector. This was in use for many years, but has since been superseded by the Adams method. He did extensive research into digital filters, devising a new filter, the Hamming window, and eventually writing an entire book on the subject, Digital Filters (1977).

During the 1950s, he programmed one of the earliest computers, the IBM 650, and with Ruth A. Weiss developed the L2 programming language, one of the earliest computer languages, in 1956. It was widely used within the Bell Labs, and also by external users, who knew it as Bell 2. It was superseded by Fortran when the Bell Labs' IBM 650 were replaced by the IBM 704 in 1957.

In A Discipline of Programming (1976), Edsger Dijkstra attributed to Hamming the problem of efficiently finding regular numbers. The problem became known as "Hamming's problem", and the regular numbers are often referred to as Hamming numbers in Computer Science, although he did not discover them.

Throughout his time at Bell Labs, Hamming avoided management responsibilities. He was promoted to management positions several times, but always managed to make these only temporary. "I knew in a sense that by avoiding management," he later recalled, "I was not doing my duty by the organization. That is one of my biggest failures."

Later life 
Hamming served as president of the Association for Computing Machinery from 1958 to 1960. In 1960, he predicted that one day half of the Bell Lab's budget would be spent on computing. None of his colleagues thought that it would ever be so high, but his forecast  actually proved to be too low. His philosophy on scientific computing appeared as the motto of his Numerical Methods for Scientists and Engineers (1962): 

In later life, Hamming became interested in teaching. Between 1960 and 1976, when he left the Bell labs, he held visiting or adjunct professorships at Stanford University, Stevens Institute of Technology, the City College of New York, the University of California at Irvine and Princeton University. As a Young Turk, Hamming had resented older scientists who had used up space and resources that would have been put to much better use by the young Turks. Looking at a commemorative poster of the Bell Labs' valued achievements, he noted that he had worked on or been associated with nearly all of those listed in the first half of his career at Bell Labs, but none in the second. He therefore resolved to retire in 1976, after thirty years.

In 1976 he moved to the Naval Postgraduate School in Monterey, California, where he worked as an adjunct professor and senior lecturer in computer science. He gave up research, and concentrated on teaching and writing books. He noted that:

Hamming attempted to rectify the situation with a new text, Methods of Mathematics Applied to Calculus, Probability, and Statistics (1985). In 1993, he remarked that "when I left BTL, I knew that that was the end of my scientific career. When I retire from here, in another sense, it's really the end." And so it proved. He became Professor Emeritus in June 1997, and delivered his last lecture in December 1997, just a few weeks before his death from a heart attack on January 7, 1998. He was survived by his wife Wanda.

Hamming's final recorded lecture series is maintained by Naval Postgraduate School along with ongoing work that preserves his insights and extends his legacy.

Appearances 
 Hamming takes part in the 1962 TV series The Computer and the Mind of Man

Awards and professional recognition 
 Turing Award, Association for Computing Machinery, 1968.

 Member of the National Academy of Engineering, 1980.
 Harold Pender Award, University of Pennsylvania, 1981.
 IEEE Richard W. Hamming Medal, 1988.
 Fellow of the Association for Computing Machinery, 1994.
 Basic Research Award, Eduard Rhein Foundation, 1996.

The IEEE Richard W. Hamming Medal, named after him, is an award given annually by the Institute of Electrical and Electronics Engineers (IEEE), for "exceptional contributions to information sciences, systems and technology", and he was the first recipient of this medal. The reverse side of the medal depicts a Hamming parity check matrix for a Hamming error-correcting code.

Bibliography 
 ; second edition 1973
 
 ; Hemisphere Pub. Corp reprint 1989; Dover reprint 2012
 
 ; second edition 1983; third edition 1989.
 
 ; second edition 1986.
 
 Unconventional introductory textbook which attempts to both teach calculus and give some idea of what it is good for at the same time.  Might be of special interest to someone teaching an introductory calculus course using a conventional textbook in order to pick up some new pedagogical viewpoints.
 
 
 Entertaining and instructive.  Hamming tries to extract general lessons—both personal and technical – to aid one in having a successful technical career by telling stories from his own experiences.

Lectures 

 1991 - You and Your Research. Lecture sponsored by the Dept. of Electrical and Computer engineering, University of California, San Diego. Electrical and Computer Engineering Distinguished Lecture Series. Digital Object Made Available by Special Collections & Archives, UC San Diego.

Notes

References

External links 

 
 

1915 births
1998 deaths
20th-century American mathematicians
American information theorists
Coding theorists
Naval Postgraduate School faculty
Numerical analysts
Manhattan Project people
Turing Award laureates
Fellows of the Association for Computing Machinery
Presidents of the Association for Computing Machinery
Fellow Members of the IEEE
University of Chicago alumni
University of Illinois Urbana-Champaign alumni
University of Nebraska–Lincoln alumni
City College of New York faculty
Scientists from Chicago
University of Louisville faculty
Mathematicians from Illinois